Chung Hyeon was the defending champion but chose not to defend his title.

Omar Jasika won the title after defeating Blake Mott 6–2, 6–2 in the final.

Seeds

Draw

Finals

Top half

Bottom half

References
 Main Draw
 Qualifying Draw

Burnie International - Singles
Burnie International